Mario Penagos (born May 30, 2002) is an American professional soccer player who plays as a midfielder for USL Championship side Sacramento Republic.

Club career
Born in Elk Grove, California, Penagos began his career at the Sacramento Republic youth academy in 2015. After impressing in the academy, Penagos was given a call up to the first team and made his first appearance from the bench on September 24, 2018, against OKC Energy.

On January 15, 2020, it was announced that Penagos, alongside academy teammate Hayden Sargis, had signed a professional contract with the Sacramento Republic in the USL Championship. He then made his competitive debut for the club on March 8 against Tulsa. Penagos started and played 68 minutes as the Sacramento Republic drew 1–1.

International career
Penagos made his debut in the United States national team setup at the under-17 level on October 4, 2018, against Argentina.

Career statistics

Club

References

External links
Profile at the Sacramento Republic FC website

2002 births
Living people
People from Elk Grove, California
American soccer players
Association football midfielders
Sacramento Republic FC players
USL Championship players
Soccer players from California
MLS Next Pro players